All These Nights in Bars Will Somehow Save My Soul is the debut studio album from English singer-songwriter Rob Lynch (formerly known as Lost on Campus) released on 22 September 2014. The album features re-recorded versions of My Friends & I and Whiskey from the Rob Lynch EP and in Pursuit Of Courage & Heart respectively.

Track listing

Personnel
 Rob Lynch – guitar/vocals/percussion
 Annie Rew-Shaw – piano/organ/keys
Bob Cooper – glockenspiel
Charlie Thomas – drums
Daniel Rothwell – trombone
Jay Malhotra – bass/electric guitar/strings/glockenspiel/lapsteel/percussion
Joe Boynton – vocals
Nick Worpole – vocals
Sam Cook – electric guitar/vocals
Sam Duckworth – electric guitar/vocals/programming/keys/piano
Sarah Maynard – flute
Shane Henderson – acoustic guitar
Terry Murphy – viola
Trevor Leonard – harmonica/vocals

References

2014 debut albums
Xtra Mile Recordings albums